Vyklantice is a municipality in Pelhřimov District in the Vysočina Region of the Czech Republic. It has about 100 inhabitants.

Administrative parts
The municipality is made up of villages of Kateřinky, Nové Vyklantice, Nový Smrdov, Petrovsko, Staré Vyklantice and Starý Smrdov.

References

Villages in Pelhřimov District